The Beta Theta Pi Fraternity House was a historic fraternity house located at the University of Illinois at Urbana–Champaign in Champaign, Illinois. Built in 1912, the building served as a house for the university's Sigma Rho chapter of the Beta Theta Pi fraternity, which was established in 1902. The house, along with the Kappa Sigma Fraternity House, established a new fraternity district to the west of the university campus. Architect Frederick J. Klein of Peoria designed the Classical Revival building. The three-story house had a two-story front porch supported by four Tuscan columns and four pilasters and topped by a balcony. The house was used by Beta Theta Pi until 2017. The chapter was disbanded in 2018, with plans to put the house up for sale. The building was demolished in the fall of 2020.

The building was added to the National Register of Historic Places on August 28, 1989.

References

Residential buildings on the National Register of Historic Places in Illinois
Neoclassical architecture in Illinois
Houses completed in 1912
National Register of Historic Places in Champaign County, Illinois
Buildings and structures of the University of Illinois Urbana-Champaign
Fraternity and sorority houses
1912 establishments in Illinois
Buildings and structures in Champaign, Illinois